Northern Railway Colony is a census town in Kanpur Nagar district in the Indian state of Uttar Pradesh.

Demographics
 India census, Northern Railway Colony had a population of 29,708. Males constitute 56% of the population and females 44%. Northern Railway Colony has an average literacy rate of 67%, higher than the national average of 59.5%: male literacy is 73%, and female literacy is 59%. In Northern Railway Colony, 12% of the population is under 6 years of age.

References

Cities and towns in Kanpur Nagar district
Railway Colonies in India